The Six Days of São Paulo was a six-day cycling event held in São Paulo, Brazil. Two editions of the event were held. The first was held in January 1957, won by Italian-Argentine team Severino Rigoni and Bruno Sivilotti; the second in March 1959, won by Brazilian duo Antonio Alba and Claudio Rosa.

Winners

References

Cycle races in Brazil
International cycle races hosted by Brazil
Velodromes in Brazil
Six-day races
1957 in track cycling
1959 in track cycling
1957 in Brazilian sport
1959 in Brazilian sport
Defunct cycling races in Brazil